The Pan American Intercollegiate Team Chess Championship  is the foremost intercollegiate team chess championship in the Americas. Hosted in part by the United States Chess Federation, the Pan-Am Intercollegiate is open to any team comprising four players and up to two alternates from the same post-secondary school (university, college, community college) in North America, Central America, South America, or the Caribbean. The Pan-Am began as such in 1946 (there had been earlier versions open to U.S. schools only), and is held annually, usually December 27–30. It has usually been held in the United States, but was hosted in Canada four times (1969, 1971, 1984, 1999). The current format is a six-round fixed-roster team Swiss-system tournament scored by team (not individual) points. Sometimes the Pan Am Intercollegiate is held as part of a larger event called the Pan American Chess Championship comprising the Pan-Am Intercollegiate, Pan-Am Scholastic Team Championship, and Pan-Am Open (for any individual).

Significance 
For many years this tournament was, in effect, a national (or continental) championship.  For a few years in the 1970s, the Continental Chess Association held a rival intercollegiate tournament, but that was discontinued.  The Pan-Am should not be confused with the Campeonato PanAmericano de Ajedrez Universitario (PanAmerican University Chess Championships), which has been held since 2006 by the Confederación De Ajedrez Para America.

Since 2001, a separate invitational team tournament has been held:  the top four finishing US schools in the Pan-Am advance to the President's Cup (informally known as the "Final Four of College Chess" and typically held in the first weekend of April), which determines the US National College or University Champion.

Organization and Rules
The governing body for the Pan-Am is the College Chess Committee (CCC) of the United States Chess Federation (USCF). The CCC ratified a set of guidelines for the Pan-Am in 1992, which have been amended by various resolutions of the CCC, most recently in 2017.  These rules include stringent eligibility requirements, which were overhauled in 2004.  There are also guidelines for conduct of a scholarship program.

College chess does not fall under the authority of the National Collegiate Athletic Association (NCAA). The Pan-Am is conducted under USCF rules and is rated both by USCF and FIDE.

At the 2012 Pan-Am, the CCC recommended that all cash prizes at the Pan-Am Intercollegiate be eliminated and forbidden.

For many years prior to 1996, high school teams were allowed to compete in the Pan-Am Intercollegiate, though few did.

History
Started in 1946, the Pan-Am has been held under various names and formats. For some years in the period 1945–1974 there was an individual college championship. Following Bobby Fischer's victory at the 1972 World Championship, the popularity of the Pan-Am temporarily soared. Beginning in the 1990s, the Pan-Am has been dominated by teams from schools offering chess scholarships.

Intercollegiate chess before the Pan Am

Quadrangular Intercollegiate league
The Quadrangular Intercollegiate league—comprising teams from Harvard University, Yale University, Columbia University and Princeton University—was formed in 1892, founded by Edward Caswell, Yale class of 1866. The tournament typically took place between Christmas and New Year's Day. Winners from 1892 to 1913 are as follows: Columbia 1892, 1893, 1899, 1902, 1906, 1907, 1910–1912; Harvard 1894–1898, 1903–1905; Yale 1901, 1913; Princeton 1908; tie between Harvard and Yale in 1909. In addition, Harvard and Yale played an annual team match.

During the first decade of the twentieth century, future world champion Jose Raul Capablanca represented Columbia, on first board.

Triangular Intercollegiate league
The Triangular Intercollegiate league—comprising teams from Cornell University, Brown University, and the University of Pennsylvania—was formed in 1899. Champions from 1899 to 1913 are as follows: Pennsylvania 1899, 1904, 1905, 1908, 1909, 1912, 1913; Cornell 1900–1903, 1907, 1910; tie between Pennsylvania and Brown in 1906; tie between Cornell and Pennsylvania in 1911.

In some years, all-star teams from the Quadrangular and Triangular leagues met in a challenge match.

Early years
The Pan-Am started in 1946.

However, there had been a team event for American schools only before World War II. One noteworthy result from this earlier event, from 1931–32, had City College of New York winning, with Reuben Fine on board one and Sidney Norman Bernstein on board two; the team scored 31.5 out of a possible 32 points.

From 1946 to 1964, the Pan-Am Intercollegiate Team Championship was held every even year, with a Pan-Am Intercollegiate Individual Championship held every odd year from 1945 to 1963.

American schools from the northeast and midwest regions dominated both the hosting and winning of the championship. Columbia University won three titles, the University of Chicago won two, and CCNY won two during this period. The first eight tournaments averaged about a dozen teams taking part. From 1962 to 1967, participation doubled to an average of about 25 teams per year.

Annual competition begins
With increased interest, annual team competition began in 1964.  In 1965, 1967, and 1969, the tournament was an individual-and-team competition, that is, players entered as individuals, but if a school had four or more players entered, the four highest of its students' scores were added to make a team score.  The 1965 event saw the first non-American winner, the University of Toronto. The first non-American school to host was Canada's McGill University at Montreal in 1969, and McGill also won the event that year. From 1968 to 1971, interest doubled again, to nearly 50 teams per year.

The Fischer boom
During the 1960s and 1970s, the level of participation in the Pan-Am grew about tenfold, as one of the effects of Bobby Fischer's chess career, culminating in the World Chess Championship.  Attendance averaged nearly 108 teams per year from 1972 to 1978; the highest turnout was 123 teams (520 players) in 1975. Nick Paleveda who became the Florida State Chess Champion persuaded The University of South Florida to offer the first chess scholarship to Future Grandmasters Larry Christiansen and Ron Henley (both recruited with chess scholarships) anchored the 1976 championship team from the University of South Florida  Tampa, the first southern school to win.

Three straight titles
The University of Toronto was the first school to win three straight outright titles, from 1980 to 1982; this feat was repeated by Harvard University from 1988–90. Rhode Island College, led by former US High School Chess Champions James Thibault and Sandeep Joshi, rolled to a convincing victory in 1985. The winning 1983 team from Yale University featured 3 future US Chess Champions in Joel Benjamin, Michael Wilder, and Inna Izrailov.

From 1979 to 1986, an average of 57 teams took part. Future US Chess Champion Grandmaster Patrick Wolff led Yale University to victory in 1987. Harvard University won four titles in five years from 1986 to 1990, either won outright or shared.

Prior to 1986 the Pan Ams were organized by the Intercollegiate League of America (ICLA). The United States Chess Federation took over the organization after the 1986 Pan-Am in Providence, Rhode Island.

Kamsky plays in Pan-Am but Vivek Rao shines
Chicago 1991 saw a reigning U.S. champion appear in the Pan-Am for the first time, when 17-year-old Soviet émigré Gata Kamsky, was first board for Brooklyn College. Kamsky lost a sensational game to Vivek Rao of the winning University of Illinois team. Rao had previously led Harvard in winning the 1988, 1989 and 1990 Pan Ams.

Chess scholarships 
The 1990s saw two important events that influenced college chess: the fall of the Iron Curtain sent a flood of very strong eastern European and former Soviet players to the Americas, and several schools began offering major chess scholarships.

The University of South Florida offered chess scholarships in 1976 to two young players, but abandoned the experiment after winning the 1976 Pan-Am. Subsequently, Rhode Island College offered chess scholarships, and eventually won the Pan-Am in 1985. The Borough of Manhattan Community College (BMCC) recruited grandmasters and eventually offered chess scholarships. BMCC won the Pan-Am in 1993, 1994, and 1997.  In contrast to those short-lived programs, the chess scholarship programs at the University of Maryland, Baltimore County (UMBC) and the University of Texas at Dallas (UTD) have taken root and continue to the present day.

In 2009, two more Texas schools fielded strong teams: University of Texas at Brownsville (UTB) and Texas Tech University; both offered chess scholarships. The 2010 Final Four was the strongest to date: it featured UMBC (average USCF rating 2559), UTD (2574), UTB (2598), and Texas Tech (2429).
In 2012, Webster University and Lindenwood have emerged as contenders.

The 2019 Pan-Am was the strongest ever:  the 63 teams included 33 Grandmasters, 20 International Masters, players from 40 FIDE federations, and eleven teams with average USCF ratings over 2500.

The 2020–2021 Pan-Am was held online at Lichess.org.

The 2023 Pan-Am was held January 5-8, 2023, in Seattle. It was won by the A team of Webster University.

List of Champions and Venues

University

Cup winners

Individual winners

Records
As of 2018, University of Maryland, Baltimore County and the University of Texas at Dallas share the record for most wins: each has won (or tied for first place) at the Pan-Am ten times.
Webster University has the record for the longest winning streak: seven-years 2012–2018. University of Maryland, Baltimore County holds the most wins at the Final Four: six times (2003–2006, 2009–2010).

References

Bibliography
 Edelman, Dan, Pan-American Intercollegiate and High School Team Chess Championships:  Official Tournament Rules, Including College Chess Committee Guidelines (January 1993). Official 1993 Version.
 Annual Reports of the USCF College Chess Committee. Available in the Annual Reports of the US Chess Federation.
 Articles about the Pan-Am Intercollegiate published in Chess Life magazine.
 Rating Reports from the Pan-Am Intercollegiate. Available from the US Chess Federation.
 Program booklets from the Pan-Am for some years.

External links
 College Chess
 Pan-Am Guidelines
 Eligibility requirements
 United States Chess Federation (USCF)
 World Chess Federation (FIDE)
 International University Sports Federation (IUSF)
 
 Events and tournaments at Monroi
 'Check Them Tech' Squad Wins Pan-Am Intercollegiate Championship (Chess.com, Jan 4, 2016)
 Webster wins Pan-Am Intercollegiate Team Championships (ChessBase.com, Dec 31, 2017)
 Pan-American Intercollegiate Team Championship Official Tournament Rules, PDF 10/18/2017 (uschess.org)

Supranational chess championships
Chess in Canada
Chess in the United States
Chess in North America
Chess Inter
Recurring events established in 1946
1946 in chess
Student sports competitions